Nelson McVicar (January 25, 1871 – December 20, 1960) was a United States district judge of the United States District Court for the Western District of Pennsylvania.

Education and career

Born in Chatham (now Chatham-Kent), Ontario, Canada, McVicar attended the University of Michigan Law School and read law to enter the bar in 1896. From 1896 to 1925, he was in private practice in Pittsburgh, Pennsylvania, and was a borough solicitor for Tarentum Borough, Pennsylvania. He was a member of the Pennsylvania House of Representatives from 1914 to 1924, and was a Judge of the Court of Common Pleas for Allegheny County, Pennsylvania from 1925 to 1928.

Federal judicial service

McVicar received a recess appointment from President Calvin Coolidge on September 14, 1928, to a seat on the United States District Court for the Western District of Pennsylvania vacated by Judge W. H. Seward Thomson. He was nominated to the same position by President Coolidge on December 6, 1928. He was confirmed by the United States Senate on December 17, 1928, and received his commission the same day. He served as Chief Judge from 1949 to 1951. He assumed senior status on February 1, 1951. His service terminated on December 20, 1960, due to his death in Tarentum.

References

Sources
 

1871 births
1960 deaths
People from Chatham-Kent
Lawyers from Pittsburgh
Canadian emigrants to the United States
Members of the Pennsylvania House of Representatives
Judges of the Pennsylvania Courts of Common Pleas
Judges of the United States District Court for the Western District of Pennsylvania
United States district court judges appointed by Calvin Coolidge
20th-century American judges
University of Michigan Law School alumni
United States federal judges admitted to the practice of law by reading law